is a Japanese character designer and animation director for Sunrise. His major works include the Queen's Blade game series which was later made into an anime adaptation, the My-Hime and My-Otome series, and numerous titles from the Brave mecha series.

Filmography

Video games

Other works
 Queen's Blade game books – Character design
 Queen's Blade Perfect Visual Collection (art book) – Character art (contributor)

References

 Book references

External links
  
 

Sunrise (company) people
Living people
Japanese animators
Japanese animated film directors
1967 births